The  was the first professional wrestling promotion to be based in Japan. It operated from 1953 to 1973.

History

JWA under Rikidōzan (1953–1963)

Rikidōzan, a former rikishi (sumo wrestling practitioner) who had debuted as a Western-style professional wrestler in 1951, decided in 1953 to establish a territory that would represent the National Wrestling Alliance in Japan.

In those early days, Japanese professional wrestlers came from out of the sumo or judo ranks; former sumotori usually used their shikona (Rikidōzan, Azumafuji, Toyonobori, etc.) while former judokas usually used their real names or modifications of them (Masahiko Kimura, Michiaki Yoshimura, etc.) Rikidōzan pushed himself as the top star of the promotion, first battling other Japanese wrestlers such as Kimura and Toshio Yamaguchi, but found a strong niche in feuds with American wrestlers such as Lou Thesz, The Destroyer and Bobo Brazil. In 1957 he defeated Thesz to win the title that would be the JWA's top title thereafter, the NWA International Heavyweight Championship. As a newly found hero to the war-weary Japanese masses, Rikidōzan expanded into several business ventures. It resulted in his murder at the hands of a gangster in 1963, at the peak of his fame.

JWA after Rikidōzan (1963–1973)

After Rikidōzan’s death in 1963, the company continued to operate as the nation’s premier (and only male) wrestling circuit until challenged in the late 1960s by International Wrestling Enterprise, which featured the first major World heavyweight championship based in Japan, the IWA title. The JWA's top stars, Giant Baba and Antonio Inoki left to form their own promotions (All Japan Pro Wrestling and New Japan Pro-Wrestling, respectively) in 1972. With its top drawing cards gone, the JWA was therefore out of business the following year.

Championships based at JWA
Japanese Heavyweight Championship
Japanese Junior Heavyweight Championship
Japanese Light Heavyweight Championship
All Japan Tag Team Championship
All Asia Heavyweight Championship (later revived by AJPW and Pro Wrestling Land's End)
All Asia Tag Team Championship (later revived by AJPW)
NWA International Heavyweight Championship (later revived by AJPW)
NWA International Tag Team Championship (later revived by AJPW)
NWA United National Championship (later revived by AJPW)

Annual tournaments

World Big League
, later renamed to simply  was a professional wrestling tournament annually held by Japanese Wrestling Association from 1959 till 1972. The 1973 edition was not held as JWA folded that year.

Wrestlers from all over the world participated in the various editions of the tournament, as it was meant since its beginning to be a world tournament. It had been one of the most important pro-wrestling tournament of its time, because it was one of the very few (and for some years after its creation the only) pro-wrestling tournaments of its time to be considered representative of the entire pro-wrestling world.

In 1970, JWA created a tag team counterpart of the World League, known as World Tag League.

Its prestige led Antonio Inoki and Giant Baba to create in their respective promotions, New Japan Pro-Wrestling and All Japan Pro Wrestling, tournaments which were presented as the direct followers to the JWA World League. Therefore, respectively, the G1 Climax for the NJPW and the Champion Carnival for the AJPW are the indirect descendant of the original World League.

The following is a list of the winners of each edition:

 1st World Big League (1959): Rikidozan by defeating Jess Ortega.
 2nd World Big League (1960): Rikidozan(2) by defeating Leo Nomellini.
 3rd World Big League (1961): Rikidozan(3) by defeating Mr. X.
 4th World Big League (1962): Rikidozan(4) by defeating Lou Thesz.
 5th World Big League (1963): Rikidozan(5) by defeating Killer Kowalski.
 6th World League (1964): Toyonobori by defeating Gene Kiniski.
 7th World League (1965): Toyonobori(2) by defeating Fred Blassie.
 8th World League (1966): Giant Baba by defeating Wilbur Snyder.
 9th World League (1967): Giant Baba(2) by defeating The Destroyer.
 10th World League (1968): Giant Baba(3) by defeating Killer Kowalski.
 11th World League (1969): Antonio Inoki by defeating Chris Markoff.
 12th World League (1970): Giant Baba(4) by defeating Don Leo Jonathan.
 13th World League (1971): Giant Baba(5) by defeating Abdullah the Butcher.
 14th World League (1972): Giant Baba(6) by defeating Gorilla Monsoon.

World Tag League
, also called World Tag League, was a professional wrestling tournament annually held by Japanese Wrestling Association from 1970 till 1972. The 1973 edition was not held as JWA folded that year. Wrestlers from all over the world participated in the various editions of the tournament, as it was meant to be a world tournament. It was created in 1970 as the tag team counterpart of World Big League.

Its prestige led Antonio Inoki and Giant Baba to create in their respective promotions, New Japan Pro-Wrestling and All Japan Pro Wrestling, tournaments which were presented as the direct followers to the JWA World Tag League. Therefore, respectively, the G1 Tag League for the NJPW and the World's Strongest Tag Determination League for the AJPW are the indirect descendant of the original World Tag League. In fact, in 2012, NJPW renamed the G1 Tag League the World Tag League.

The following is a list of the winners of each edition:

 1st NWA Tag League (1970): Antonio Inoki and Kantaro Hoshino by defeating Nick Bockwinkel and John Quinn.
 2nd NWA Tag League (1971): Antonio Inoki (2) and Seiji Sakaguchi by defeating Killer Kowalski and Buddy Austin.
 3rd NWA Tag League (1972): Seiji Sakaguchi (2) and Akihisa Takachiho by defeating Larry Hamilton and Joe Hamilton.

Alumni
This is not an exhaustive list, as the JWA was the only Japanese promotion until 1966 and many wrestlers, both Japanese who competed for a brief time and then retired, or foreigners who came for a single tour, were booked.

Japanese
Rikidōzan
Masahiko Kimura
Azumafuji
Surugaumi
Toyonobori
Michiaki Yoshimura
Yoshinosato
Kohkichi Endoh
Isao Yoshiwara
Yasuhiro Kojima
Kintaro Ohki
Shohei "Giant" Baba
Kanji "Antonio" Inoki
Umanosuke Ueda
Katsuhisa Shibata
Mitsu Hirai
Kantaro Hoshino
Kotetsu Yamamoto
Motoshi Ohkuma
Raizō Kojika
Masao Kimura
Haruka Eigen
Seiji Sakaguchi
Masanori Saito
Katsuji Adachi
Akihisa Takachiho
Kazuo Sakurada
Masanori Toguchi
Masashi Ozawa
Osamu Kido
Tatsumi Fujinami
Akio Sato
Kengo Kimura
Mitsuo Hata
Kenzo Suzuki
Masao Itoh

Foreigners
Lou Thesz - first NWA World Heavyweight Champion to defend the title in Japan
King Kong Czaya
Tiger Joginder Singh
Dara Singh
Freddie Blassie
The Destroyer
Bobo Brazil
The Sheik
Bill Dromo
Fritz Von Erich
Gene Kiniski
Syed Saif Shah
Bruno Sammartino
Dory Funk, Jr.
Terry Funk
Abdullah the Butcher
Alex Iakovidis
Mil Máscaras
Crusher Lisowski
Dick the Bruiser
Wilbur Snyder
Danny Hodge
Karl Gotch
Johnny Valentine
Harley Race
Fritz von Goering
Mike Sharpe Sr.
Ben Sharpe
Bobby Bruns
Harold Sakata

See also

Professional wrestling in Japan
List of professional wrestling promotions in Japan

References

External links
puroresu.com: JWA
JWA Title Histories
PuroresuWiki

Japanese professional wrestling promotions
1953 establishments in Japan
1973 disestablishments in Japan
National Wrestling Alliance members
Japan Pro Wrestling Alliance